The men's welterweight event was part of the boxing programme at the 1976 Summer Olympics. The weight class allowed boxers of up to 67 kilograms to compete. The competition was held from 18 to 31 July 1976. 31 boxers from 31 nations competed.

Medalists

Results
The following boxers took part in the event:

First round
 Ju Seok-Kim (KOR) def. Marcelino García (ISV), walk-over
 Yoshioki Seki (JPN) def. Mathias Sabo (NGA), walk-over
 Jochen Bachfeld (GDR) def. Ali Bahri Khomani (IRN), RSC-1
 Athanasios Iliadis (GRE) def. Omar Shima (LIB), walk-over
 Valeri Rachkov (URS) def. Martti Marjamaa (FIN), RSC-3
 David Jackson (NZL) def. Fredj Chtiqui (TUN), RSC-2

Second round
 Robert Dauer (AUS) def. Frans van Bronckhorst (INA), 5:0
 Mike McCallum (JAM) def. Damdinjavyn Bandi (MGL), 5:0
 Reinhard Skricek (FRG) def. José Vallejo (DOM), 5:0
 Luigi Minchillo (ITA) def. Vitalis Bbegge (UGA), walk-over
 Clinton Jackson (USA) def. Zbigniew Kicka (POL), 5:0
 Wesly Felix (HAI) def. Vincent Dabire (BUR), walk-over
 Pedro Gamarro (VEN) def. Marijan Beneš (YUG), 5:0
 Emilio Correa (CUB) def. Plamen Yankov (BUL), RSC-2
 Ib Boetcher (DEN) def. Charles Mutti (ZAM), walk-over
 Carlos Santos (PUR) def. Carlos Mejia (COL), 5:0
 Victor Zilberman (ROM) def. Amon Kotey (GHA), walk-over
 Colin Jones (GBR) def. Christy McLoughlin (IRL), 5:0
 Carmen Rinke (CAN) def. Kenneth Bristol (GUY), walk-over
 Yoshioki Seki (JPN) def. Ju Seok-Kim (KOR), DSQ-1
 Jochen Bachfeld (GDR) def. Athanasios Iliadis (GRE), 5:0
 Valeri Rachkov (URS) def. David Jackson (NZL), 5:0

Third round
 Mike McCallum (JAM) def. Robert Dauer (AUS), 5:0
 Reinhard Skricek (FRG) def. Luigi Minchillo (ITA), 5:0
 Clinton Jackson (USA) def. Wesly Felix (HAI), KO-1
 Pedro Gamarro (VEN) def. Emilio Correa (CUB), RSC-3
 Carlos Santos (PUR) def. Ib Boetcher (DEN), 5:0
 Victor Zilberman (ROM) def. Colin Jones (GBR), 5:0
 Carmen Rinke (CAN) def. Yoshioki Seki (JPN), 4:1
 Jochen Bachfeld (GDR) def. Valeri Rachkov (URS), 4:1

Quarterfinals
 Reinhard Skricek (FRG) def. Mike McCallum (JAM), 3:2
 Pedro Gamarro (VEN) def. Clinton Jackson (USA), 3:2
 Victor Zilberman (ROM) def. Carlos Santos (PUR), 3:2
 Jochen Bachfeld (GDR) def. Carmen Rinke (CAN), 5:0

Semifinals
 Pedro Gamarro (VEN) def. Reinhard Skricek (FRG), RSC-3
 Jochen Bachfeld (GDR) def. Victor Zilberman (ROM), 3:2

Final
 Jochen Bachfeld (GDR) def. Pedro Gamarro (VEN), 3:2

References

Welterweight